White Township is a township in Benton County, in the U.S. state of Missouri.

White Township was formed on November 12, 1838, taking its name from Judge William White, one of the first settlers, and then county judge.

References

Townships in Missouri
Townships in Benton County, Missouri